Campo Novo de Rondônia is a municipality located in the Brazilian state of Rondônia. Its population was 14,266 (2020) and its area is 3,442 km2.

References

Municipalities in Rondônia